Leanne Johnston is a Canadian hiker, who currently holds the woman's time record on the Grouse Grind race that takes place every year on Grouse Mountain. Her 2007 time was 31:04.  Johnston finished the 2006 BMO Bank of Montreal Grouse Grind Mountain Run with a time of 33 minutes and 47 seconds.

References

External links
Summer on Grouse Mountain

Year of birth missing (living people)
Living people
Sportspeople from Regina, Saskatchewan
People from North Vancouver
Hikers
Canadian sportswomen